Ampthill Park and Ampthill Park House is a country estate in Ampthill, Bedfordshire, England. The park was opened to the public after the Second World War.

From the 14th century Ampthill Park was a royal lodge and hunting park. In the 15th century it was occupied by Sir John Cornwall, who had married the king's sister, Elizabeth of Lancaster, Duchess of Exeter. Sir John amassed a large fortune and constructed Ampthill Castle, a fortified house. After his death Ampthill Park passed to Edmund Grey, 1st Earl of Kent before becoming royal property again. Henry VIII used it for hunting and to hold Katherine of Aragon during the annulment of their marriage. By 1600 the castle was ruinous and in 1661 the park was given by Charles II to John Ashburnham, a Royalist supporter.

The present house was built from 1687-1689 by architect Robert Grumbold for the Ossory family who  held the estate under lease. In the late 1700s the house was remodelled by Sir William Chambers and the grounds landscaped by Capability Brown.

On the death of Lord Upper Ossory on 13 February 1818, Ampthill Park became the seat of Lord Holland in whose time Holland House in Kensington, London, became famous as a gathering place for intellectuals. Notable 20th-century architect Sir Albert Richardson lived in Ampthill from 1919 until his death in 1964.

During World War II the estate was occupied by the army. There was a farming camp near Ampthill, where volunteers recovered sugarbeet and were accommodated in tents in the grounds. After the war it was sold to Bovril Limited, becoming a Cheshire Home for the Disabled in 1955. In 1979, the mansion was rescued from dereliction and divided into four large homes. It is a grade II* listed building.
The park is listed grade II.

Ampthill Park was the burial place for the golden hare in the Kit Williams treasure hunt Masquerade.

Ampthill Park House should not be confused with the former Ampthill House, which was demolished in 1953. The site of Ampthill House  was developed for housing along today's Church Avenue in Ampthill town.

References

Country houses in Bedfordshire
Gardens by Capability Brown
Grade II* listed buildings in Bedfordshire